Zopherus granicollis is a species of ironclad beetle in the family Zopheridae. It is found in Central America and North America.

Subspecies
These two subspecies belong to the species Zopherus granicollis:
 Zopherus granicollis granicollis Horn, 1885
 Zopherus granicollis ventriosus (Casey, 1907)

References

Further reading

 

Zopheridae
Articles created by Qbugbot
Beetles described in 1885